Sir Alan Arthur Saunders OBE (15 December 1892 – 26 February 1957) was an English cricketer and businessman.  Saunders was a right-handed batsman, though his bowling style is unknown.  He was born at Brighton, Sussex. He served as chairman of the British Sugar Corporation and the National Research Development Corporation.

Military career
Saunders served in the Royal Engineers as an acting major during the First World War for which he was appointed an Officer of the Order of the British Empire.

Cricketing career
Saunders made his first-class debut for Sussex against Hampshire in the 1922 County Championship.  He made eleven further first-class appearances for the county, the last of which came against Nottinghamshire in the 1923 County Championship.  In his eleven first-class matches, he scored 186 runs at an average of 11.62, with a high score of 36.  With the ball, he took 2 wickets at a bowling average of 64.50, with best figures of 1/6.

Business career
Saunders acted as Co-ordinator of Building Supplies for the Ministry of Health in the late 1940s for which role he was knighted. He became chairman of the British Sugar Corporation in 1949 and also served as chairman of the National Research Development Corporation from 1955. He died at Hove, Sussex on 26 February 1957. His widow, Lady Saunders, died in 1974.

References

External links
Alan Saunders at ESPNcricinfo
Alan Saunders at CricketArchive

1892 births
1957 deaths
Sportspeople from Brighton
English cricketers
Sussex cricketers
Officers of the Order of the British Empire
Knights Bachelor
British Army personnel of World War I
Royal Engineers officers